William Henry Law (September 11, 1803 – March 27, 1881) was an American politician.

Law, third son of the Hon. Lyman Law, and grandson of the Hon. Richard Law, was born in New London, Conn., September 11, 1803. His mother was Elizabeth, daughter of Amasa Learned.

He graduated from Yale College in 1822.  He studied law with his father, in New London, and after his admission to the bar, in 1826, practiced there until 1830. He then retired from his profession, and in 1832 removed to Norwich, Conn., which he represented the same year in the Connecticut General Assembly. In 1868 he removed to New Haven, Conn., where he died, March 27, 1881, in his 78th year.

In February, 1829, he married Mary Lee, of Norwich, who died in October, 1839, leaving one daughter. In October, 1855, he married Harriet B. Mills, of Mississippi, who survived him with one son, a graduate of Yale in the class of 1878.

External links

1803 births
1881 deaths
Politicians from New London, Connecticut
Yale College alumni
Connecticut lawyers
Members of the Connecticut General Assembly
19th-century American politicians
19th-century American lawyers